4T Center - Vietnam Youth Education Support Center is a social organization in Hanoi, Vietnam, based on non-profit operation with the mission of education support and comprehensive development for Vietnamese Youth. Its abbreviation name is 4T Center which comes from these four words in Vietnamese: "Tam" (Heart), "Tri" (Mind), "Tai" (Talent) and "Tay" (Hand), representing important qualities of a young person.

History
4T Center initiated as a group of volunteers gathering students from different universities in Hannoi. The idea of establishing a Center for Vietnamese youth also came from a young Vietnamese, Mr. Nguyen Tung Lam, Deputy Director of 4T Center. After two years of operating as a social entrepreneur, 4T Center was officially founded on 23 September 2011 as a social organization under its Parent Organization "Vietnam Association for Promoting Education". Since its establishment, 4T has established connection with other organizations in Vietnam and the World. At the end of 2011, 4T became the first partner organization of 4-H and took part in the 2nd International 4-H Youth Winter Camp in December 2011.

Current programs
Kid-camp holds non- formal education activities for kids from 8-18 providing chance of learning by doing through playing activities to learn and exchange essential skills and other moral values. The fund is from parents’ participation fee. The program is coordinated by 4T Center with the participation of volunteers in 4Tclubs. Kid-camps include weekend camps and summer camps in variety of topic such as Sport Camp, International Camp, Skill Camp, Career Training Camp and Countryside Camp.

Youth clubs is an operating model for youth to join voluntarily, lead the clubs, expand their members and launch community service to practice democracy and exchange essential skills like teamwork or leadership. Clubs operate based on membership fee and other self-raising fund activities. Youth expand their members and launch community service programs involving in training, environmental conservation, camping, events or other extracurricular activities for kids.

Youth projects focus on emerging problems of youth and get direct involvement of youth in solving these problems. Forms of training, workshops and non-formal educational activities are launched to provide necessary knowledge and skills for youth to actively participate in the projects. 4T staffs are key project officers to coordinate clubs’ network to implement project. Expense is from business sponsors, local or international funds and other self-funding activities.

Youth events are prominent events towards youth to attract concern of the society on youth development such as festival, workshop, camps in variety of topics. In 2011, an event was held by 4T Center called "Hello Summer Camp". This event attracts concerns of journalists and participation of numerous parents and children.

Responsible parents network sets up a parental network to enhance their responsibilities and concerns about their children’s extracurricular activities, encouraging their support in activities’ organizing and sponsor for comprehensive development of their children.

Projects

Website truonghocvungcao.vn
The project, aiming at providing a better education for children in mountainous areas, has set up a website named truonghocvungcao or "mountainous schools".  Arose from the reality that educational development in these areas has to cope with a lot of difficulties such as high dropout rate of school students, lack of teaching materials and studying equipment as well as poor education infrastructure, 4T Center proposed a project on supporting Education in remote Areas. A website has been established to provide information about educational condition of schools in these areas of Hoa Binh and Son La province. The information needed for the website has been collected and compiled by groups of volunteers from 4T’s youth network. The website is an information channel to update news about obstacles in educational conditions of mountainous students as well as raise funds and supports from sponsors, parents, businesses and the whole community for a better future of poor students.

Empowering Youth Integrity
The project is the cooperation among 4T Center, Towards Transparency Organization and Transparency International to strengthen Youth capacity in fighting corruption. 4T Center and its partner organization realized that it is important to promote integrity as a core personal value among youth. Integrity education program will be introduced to students in selected secondary schools in Hanoi through extra-curriculum lessons. Youth in 4T clubs network will be the facilitators of integrity lessons for their junior fellows. As integrity peer trainers, the youth are expected to be good examples of integrity for their peers and younger fellows to follow. Apart from non-formal integrity educational program in schools, youth will be provided chances to expand their understanding about anti-corruption through a competition called "Flat Connection" and an integrity festival. The project started from October 2011 and will end in June 2012.

References

Trang chủ

External links
Facebook address
Website truonghocvungcao
Flat Connection
Website 4T Volunteer
4T Forum

Youth organizations based in Vietnam
Educational charities
Youth empowerment organizations